The Hotel Paris, at 7 S. Main St. in Paris, Idaho, is a historic hotel that was built in 1916.

The hotel's design includes elements of the Prairie School and bungalow styles. The brick building has flat-roofed porches supported by wooden piers on both street-facing sides. A flat cornice rests below the hotel's roof line. While the Paris Public School also has a horizontal emphasis in its design, the hotel's blend of its two styles is unique in Paris.

It was listed on the National Register of Historic Places in 1982.

The hotel is still in operation.  It is located next to the historic LDS Tabernacle and a museum in downtown Paris.

References

External links

The Paris Hotel, official website

Hotel buildings on the National Register of Historic Places in Idaho
Prairie School architecture in Idaho
Hotel buildings completed in 1916
Buildings and structures in Bear Lake County, Idaho
Hotels in Idaho
National Register of Historic Places in Bear Lake County, Idaho
1916 establishments in Idaho